Cadoxton Terrace Halt railway station served the village of Cadoxton-juxta-Neath, in the historical county of Glamorganshire, Wales, from 1929 to 1964 on the Neath and Brecon Railway.

History 
The station was opened on 18 March 1929 by Great Western Railway. It closed on 15 October 1962.

References 

Disused railway stations in Neath Port Talbot
Railway stations in Great Britain opened in 1929
Railway stations in Great Britain closed in 1962
1929 establishments in Wales
1962 disestablishments in Wales
Former Great Western Railway stations